Baseball at the 2013 Canada Summer Games was held in Sherbrooke, Quebec at the Stade Amédée Roy, Stade Julien Morin in Coaticook, and Parc de l'Est, in Magog.

The events will be held during the first week between August 3 and 9, 2013.

Medal table
The following is the medal table for cycling at the 2013 Canada Summer Games.

Medallists

Results

Group A

Group B

Playoffs

See also

References

2013 in baseball
2013 Canada Summer Games
Canada Summer
2013 Canada Games
Baseball in Quebec